Frans Anatolius Sjöström (3 July 1840 – 1 August 1885) was a Finland Swedish architect. He was born in Turku and educated there and, in 1868, at the Royal Swedish Academy of Arts. In 1872 he designed the old building of the Helsinki University of Technology. He died in Rönnskär.

References 

1840 births
1885 deaths
People from Turku
People from Turku and Pori Province (Grand Duchy of Finland)
Finnish architects
19th-century Finnish architects
Swedish-speaking Finns